Anav may refer to:
 Anab, or Anav, a Biblical place
 Adjusted net asset value (ANAV)

As a surname
Capucine Anav, French comedian
Members of the Anav family (:he:משפחת הענוים):
Judah ben Benjamin Anav, Italian Rabbi, approximately 1215–1280
Jehiel ben Jekuthiel Anav, Italian Rabbi, thirteenth and fourteenth centuries
Zedekiah ben Abraham Anav, Italian Rabbi, 1210 – c. 1280
Benjamin ben Abraham Anav, Italian Rabbi, a brother of Zedekiah ben Abraham Anav